The Empire is a South Korean television series starring Kim Sun-a, Ahn Jae-wook, and Lee Mi-sook. It premiered on JTBC on September 24, 2022, and aired every Saturday and Sunday at 22:30 (KST).

Synopsis 
A series that depicts the scandalous scandals of the nation's top law-abiding aristocrats dreaming of hereditary succession.

Cast

Main
 Kim Sun-a as Han Hye-ryul
Head of the Special Division of the Seoul Central District Prosecutor's Office. First daughter of Han Gun-do and Ham Kwang-jeon.
 Ahn Jae-wook as Na Geun-woo
A law school professor, Han Gun-do's and Ham Kwang-jeon's son-in-law and Han Hye-ryul's husband.
 Lee Mi-sook as Ham Kwang-jeon
Director of Minguk University Law School, daughter of Ham Min-heon, Han Gun-do's Wife.
 Song Young-chang as Han Gun-do
Lawyer representing Ham & Lee's law firm, Ham Kwang-jeon's husband.
 Shin Goo as Ham Min-heon
Ham Kwang-jeon's father, Lee Ae-heon's husband.
 Oh Hyun-kyung as Lee Ae-heon
Ham Min-heon's wife.

Supporting

Han Hye-ryul's family
 Kwon Ji-woo as Han Kang-baek
Han Hye-ryul's son, Minguk University Law School's student.
 Kim Jung-woon as Han Moo-ryul 
The second daughter of Han Gun-do and Ham Kwang-jeon, a judge of the Central District Court.
 Choi Jung-woon as Han Kang-ye
Na Geun-woo and Han Hye-ryul's daughter.

Minguk University Law School
 Joo Se-bin as Hong Nan-hee 
Nan-hee, who dreams of saving the world and saving lives, is an engineer. After her father died, she attended Minguk University Law School.
 Jung Jae-oh as Jung Kyung-yoon
He is well thought out, smart and capable, therefore, his grade was always at the top. The teacher liked it because of his bright and friendly personality.
 Lee Ga-eun as Jang Ji-yi
Jang Il's only daughter, has interacted with Hye-ryul's family since childhood. She never doubted that one day she would marry Han Kang-baek.
 Bang Joo-hwan as Yoo Hyun
He grew up in a single-mother family. He knew from the beginning that crying and being angry at what could not be helped was the opposite. Sometimes he felt that the judge was not suitable for his age.
 Kwon So-yi as Lee Ah-jeong 
Nan-hee's roommate with an undeniable shy personality and very suffocating because of observing others. It is most convenient to blame others and blame yourself.
 Kim Young-woong as Hwang Yong-ji 
Lecturer at the Faculty of Law, Minguk University's fellow professor of Na Geun-woo who teaches criminal law and criminal procedural law.
 Kim Gyun-ha as Yoon Gu-ryung
After conscription, he went to Minguk University Law School. His grades gradually declined, and he was eventually suspended from school for the second year. He had to study with his juniors.

Prosecutor's office
 Lee Moon-sik as Jang Il 
Seoul Central District Attorney's Office. The position he was currently sitting in was not a place where skill and luck were sufficient, so Jang Il is someone with more alpha positive.
 Kim Hyung-mook as Go Won-kyung
Seoul Central District Attorney's Office Department of Corruption Investigation. Hye-ryul's ex-husband and Kang-baek's biological father.
 Han Joon-woo as Oh Sung-hyun 
Anti-Corruption Investigation Prosecutor of the Seoul Central District Prosecutor's Office.

Police station figures
 Park Jin-woo as Ji Gu-won
As a police officer under the supervision of the prosecution, have set a corner with the prosecutor in every case relegated, returned to Seoul with difficulty. He encountered a once-in-a-lifetime event.
 Woo Ji-hyun as Wang Jung-jin 
He's a pretty good detective and is Ji Gu-won's partner in various investigations.

Others
 Kim Won-hae as Do-pil / Ji Joon-gi 
A person called 'Chief of the Branch'.
 Tae In-ho as Nam Soo-hyuk
Gun-do's right arm, he believed in himself.
 Im Se-mi as Yoon Eun-mi 
SBC TV reporter. As a reporter, she is full of passion and passion, and although sometimes she crosses a dangerous line, she had unshakable faith.
 Choi Jung-woo as Senior Ahn / Ahn Soo-seok
Senior Civil Affairs Officer at the Blue House.

Extended
 Kwon Oh-kyung as Prosecution investigation officer
 Kim Hak-sun as Hong Nan-hee's father

Production

Development
The series was written by Oh Ja-kyu and planned and produced by JTBC Studios (now known as SLL), with Celltrion Entertainment as producer.

Release
On August 24, 2022, JTBC released the first footage of the series along with announcing the premiere date. The series was scheduled to be shown on September 24, 2022, as a follow-up to The Good Detective 2 on Saturday and Sunday.

Viewership

Notes

References

External links
  
 
 

Korean-language television shows
JTBC television dramas
Television series by JTBC Studios
Television series by Celltrion Entertainment
2022 South Korean television series debuts
2022 South Korean television series endings
South Korean legal television series
South Korean crime television series
Korean-language Viu (streaming media) exclusive international distribution programming